Ystradgynlais Community Hospital is a health facility in Glanrhyd Road, Ystradgynlais, Powys, Wales. It is managed by the Powys Teaching Health Board.

History
The facility was commissioned to replace the aging Craig-y-Nos Hospital. It was designed by Anthony Williams & Partners and built on part of the site of the old Ynyscedwyn Ironworks, opening in January 1986. Modern hydrotherapy facilities were installed at the hospital in 2006.

Welsh Health Common Services Authority won the Gold Medal for Architecture at the National Eisteddfod of Wales of 1988 for their work on the Ystradgynlais Community Hospital.

References

Hospitals in Powys
Hospitals established in 1986
1986 establishments in Wales
Hospital buildings completed in 1986
NHS hospitals in Wales
Powys Teaching Health Board
Welsh Eisteddfod Gold Medal winners